Duke Alexander of Württemberg may refer to:
Duke Alexander of Württemberg (1771–1833), son of Frederick II Eugene, Duke of Württemberg, founder of the fifth branch of the House of Württemberg
Duke Alexander of Württemberg (1804–1881), son of Duke Alexander of Württemberg (1771–1833), first cousin to Queen Victoria
Duke Alexander of Württemberg (1804–1885), of the second branch of the House of Württemberg, father of Francis, Duke of Teck and the grandfather of Mary of Teck